Barbarellas are an Irish pop duo, consisting of twins Edele and Keavy Lynch (born 15 December 1979), former members of pop girl group B*Witched. The duo were signed to Ceol Music, and released their debut (and only) album Night Mode in April 2011.

History
After B*Witched split, in 2002, Edele worked as a songwriter with the Xenomania production team, co-writing tracks as "Some Kind of Miracle" for Girls Aloud and "Situations Heavy" for the Sugababes. Keavy formed a music production company called Ziiiing!. From 2006 through 2009, Lynch twins posted several demos through their official MySpace page as Ms Lynch.

In 2010 they formed the duo Barbarellas and, on 19 January 2011, the duo's debut single "Body Rock" was released, produced by Yoad Nevo, and remixed by Manhattan Clique and Riffs&Rays. Popjustice called the song "basically a completely amazing chorus with some slightly less amazing other stuff thrown in". Their second single, "Night Mode" (originally titled "Diet Coke"), was released on 10 April 2011 to a mixed reaction from fans, who criticised the change from "Diet Coke" to "Night Mode". The duo's debut album Night Mode was released on 17 April 2011 to a mixed reception from critics, and like the singles, did not appear in the Top 100. The duo ended in October 2012 when it was announced that B*Witched would reunite.

Discography

Albums

Singles

References

Irish pop music groups
Irish musical duos
Musical groups established in 2010
Musical groups disestablished in 2012
Sibling musical duos
Twin musical duos
Irish girl groups
Musical groups from Dublin (city)
Living people
Irish electronic musicians
Year of birth missing (living people)